Meteor Games was an independent online gaming studio formed in 2007 by Neopets founders Adam Powell and Donna Powell.

According to a statement released by the company, its games will "cross the appeal of social networks, web-based casual games and
traditional massively multiplayer online games."

Company overview
Meteor Games was an independent online gaming studio committed to developing "fun, immersive, and innovative games spanning the web, social networks, and mobile devices". The company was founded in 2007 by the creators of the Internet phenomenon Neopets and were headquartered in Beverly Hills, CA.

The headquarters was located in Los Angeles and had at its peak 100 employees.

History
Meteor Games' first project was the MMO Twin Skies, with the first public demo of the game being shown at the Penny Arcade Expo (PAX) in Seattle.
The game was originally planned to be in 3D, but was later changed to become a 2D Flash game.

In the company's shift to the rapidly growing social gaming market it released several games based on internal intellectual property including: Island Paradise which became a large commercial success, Serf Wars, and Ranch Town.

Layoffs
In October 2011 26 workers were laid off and at the end of November 2011 it was acknowledged that all but those related to maintenance of the remaining games run by Meteor Games on Facebook were being let go. Then somewhere around March or April 2012, the remainder of the Meteor Games staff were let go after Island Paradise was shut down around April. At the same time it was confirmed that then CEO Zac Brandenberg, who joined the company in 2010, had left in November, leaving Adam and Donna Powell to oversee the site. Sometime in either 2010 (around when Zac Brandenberg left) or early 2011, Adam also exited Meteor Games, which left Donna as sole COO and CEO of the company.

Games

Twin Skies
Twin Skies was a planned flash game to be created through Meteor Games as their first gaming project. Initial response to the game's announcement at the 2008 Penny Arcade Expo was positive. Later reports stated that Meteor Games had scrapped plans to release the game as a MMOG, but moved to produce the game via flash due to economic issues. The move was met with disappointment by gaming websites such as Kotaku, who commented that it was "a pity" as the "original concept was extremely intriguing." Gameplay was initially planned to include several elements such as social interaction and mini-flash games that would have directly influenced the world in the Twin Skies MMO. Twin Skies was originally planned to enter beta testing in late 2008, with a projected full launch in 2009, but was later cancelled due to massive layoffs at Meteor Games.

Serf Wars
Serf Wars encourages players to transform their land from a rotten borough into a thriving fantasy kingdom. Gamers play arcade-style minigames, train an army, raise their population, and take part in quests as they expand their domains. Players can ally with their friends or wage war against them. This game became discontinued around the end of late February to early March 2012 along with Ranch Town.

Island Paradise
Island Paradise was a social network-based application available on Facebook, where players create their own tropical island escape to play with friends, tend crops, plant trees and raise animals. In addition, players can visit other islands to help their neighbor's level-up faster – or to steal untended crops. Island Paradise was launched 25 August 2009. As of November 2009, Island Paradise had roughly 6.8 million monthly active users. After two years the game continued to be a commercial success. In the beginning of April 2012, the game went offline without releasing any message by the developers.

Ranch Town
Named one of the top gaining Facebook apps in early June 2010, Ranch Town gives desperados a chance to live – and play – in the iconic Gold Rush era of American history.  Using popular "farming" game mechanics, players start with their own plot of land, a lonely cow and a handful of mining nodes and can stake claim to, cultivate and mine for gold to grow their wealth. This game became discontinued about the end of late February to early March 2012.

Neopets: Treasure Keepers
In conjunction with Neopets, Meteor developed a new game based in the world Adam and Donna first created, Neopia. There was the ability to do quests on a board game-like map, sell items to NPCs in your shop, and earn achievements. These achievements sometimes come with a code for a free item on Neopets.

It was confirmed due to money losses and a plummet of users over the last few months along with laying off 90% of Meteor Games staff, Neopets: Treasure Keepers was shut down on Wednesday, 14 December 2011. Upon closing, users of the game were given a code to use on the Neopets.com website for 10,000 in-game NP and 11 other virtual items.

Discontinued games

 Vikings, Pirates, and Ninjas
 My Sweet Shop 
Little Rock Pool 
 Neopets: Treasure Keepers
 Serf Wars
 Ranch Town
 Island Paradise

References

External links
 
 

Video game companies of the United States
American companies established in 2007
Companies based in California
2007 establishments in California
Inactive massively multiplayer online games